Saint-Michel de Grandmont Priory  is a former monastery of the Order of Grandmont in the commune of Saint-Privat, in Hérault, France.  The priory is located in a wild area at the heart of an oak forest, about 10 km from the town of Lodève.

The Priory is now maintained by “Les Amis du Prieure Saint Michel de Grandmont”, a non-profit-making association.

History 
This 12th-century priory is one of the best-preserved of the 160 Grandmontine monasteries - a religious order, founded by Étienne of Thiers, son of Viscount of Thiers from the Auvergne. When he was 12, Etienne was taken by his father to Italy, where he studied under Milo, who would later to become Archbishop of Benevento. Here the young Etienne met with the Calabrian monks who practised Byzantine rites, and thus discovered his vocation. Upon his return to France in 1076, Etienne searched for somewhere to practise the Gospel in prayer, and solitude. He chose an isolated location in the forest of Muret (near to Limoges). A hut-dwelling community of hermits began to develop around him, and they soon built a church, and living quarters as their numbers grew.

His death prompted the movement of his flock to the Grandmont plateau, near Limoges, where they built the Abbey of Grandmont. This became the hub to more than 160 smaller monasteries, inhabited by more than 1500 hermits, of which, the Priory of St Michel de Grandmont at Lodève was one. By 1772 the Grandmontaine Order had dwindled in popularity, and was eventually dissolved, and the Priory was absorbed into the Diocese of Lodève. Two monks remained in the Priory until their deaths in 1785.

It was considered to be one of the strictest and most austere order of the Middle Ages. There was no hierarchy, no archives, and no heating. The monks walked with bare feet, in perpetual silence. They ate no meat, and fasted regularly. As they worked, they engaged in silent prayer. Theirs was the first order to be permitted to beg for food.

After the French revolution, the priory passed into the hands of a local merchant family, who developed it as a home, and agricultural estate. From 1849 to 1936 it was owned by the Vitalis family, who were cloth manufacturers. Etienne Vitalis restored the buildings, making them fit for habitation, and wine production. In 1957 it was bought by the Bec family, who owned a local engineering firm. In 1980 the Priory was classed as a  historic monument, and opened its doors to the public.

Architecture 
The Priory of St Michel de Grandmont is the only surviving building from the order of Grandmont.  The group of buildings includes a church, a Romanesque cloister surmounted by a pinnacle, and a chapter house and cellar.

External links 

 

Christian monasteries established in the 11th century
12th-century churches in France
Buildings and structures in Hérault
Augustinian monasteries in France
Romanesque architecture in France
Churches in Hérault